Radu Albot and Farrukh Dustov were the defending champions, but they decided not to play together. Dustov played alongside Alessandro Motti, and Radu Albot was absent from the tournament.

Flavio Cipolla and Goran Tošić won the title, defeating Victor Baluda and Konstantin Kravchuk in the final, 3–6, 7–5, [12–10].

Seeds

Draw

Draw

References
Main Draw

Kazan Kremlin Cup - Doubles
2014 Doubles
2014 in Russian tennis